Francis Patrick Neill, Baron Neill of Bladen,  (8 August 1926 – 28 May 2016) was a British barrister and a crossbench member of the House of Lords.

Early life and education
A son of Sir Thomas Neill, Patrick Neill was educated at Highgate School and Magdalen College, Oxford.

Legal career
He became a barrister in 1951 and took silk in 1966. After heading One Hare Court, he became head of chambers of Serle Court, in Lincoln's Inn when the two merged in 1999. He worked alongside Henry Fisher, Roger Parker, Gordon Slynn, and Richard Southwell QC Lord Neill left Serle Court in 2008 to join his elder brother Sir Brian Neill, a former Court of Appeal judge, at 20 Essex Street.

University of Oxford
He was Warden of All Souls College, Oxford, from 1977 until 1995, and an Honorary Fellow since 1995. He was Vice-Chancellor of Oxford University from 1985 till 1989, and played a major part in the University's decision to undertake The Campaign for Oxford. He was an unsuccessful candidate in the 2003 University of Oxford Chancellor election.

Family life
In 1954, he married Caroline Susan Debenham, daughter of Sir Piers Kenrick Debenham.  They had six children:

 Timothy Piers Patrick Neill
 Robin Charles Richard Neill
 Jonathan Francis Kenrick Neill
 Harriet Susan Anne Neill
 Matthew Piers Thomas Neill
 Emma Charlotte Angela Neill, married to Rt Hon. Christopher Geidt, Baron Geidt, the former Private Secretary to HM The Queen.

He died in May 2016 at the age of 89.

Honours
Having been knighted in 1983, Neill was made a Life Peer as Baron Neill of Bladen, of Briantspuddle in the County of Dorset, on 28 November 1997. He sat in the House of Lords as a crossbencher until 18 May 2016, at which point he ceased to be a member pursuant to section 2 of the House of Lords Reform Act 2014, having failed to attend during the whole of the 2015–16 session without being on leave of absence.

References

External links
Personal Biography

|-

|-

1926 births
2016 deaths
People educated at Highgate School
Alumni of Magdalen College, Oxford
English King's Counsel
20th-century King's Counsel
Wardens of All Souls College, Oxford
Vice-Chancellors of the University of Oxford
Crossbench life peers
Knights Bachelor
English people of Irish descent
20th-century English lawyers
Member of the Committee on Standards in Public Life
Life peers created by Elizabeth II